Katie Hooten is an American actress and film producer. She is married to Timothy Hooten, and is the sister of filmmakers Cory Edwards and Todd Edwards. As a child she participated in theatre, and along with her brothers, made Super 8 home videos.
She is a graduate of Anderson University, of which her father is the president.
After performing with her brothers and her husband in the 1999 independent film Chillicothe, directed by Todd Edwards, she joined The Walt Disney Company, working as a post-production coordinator on the films Atlantis: The Lost Empire, Spirited Away, and Lilo & Stitch, and as an assistant production manager on the short films Destino and Lorenzo. She served as an associate producer on the 2005 independent computer animated film Hoodwinked, directed by Cory Edwards, Todd Edwards, and Tony Leech. The film, which was one of the first fully independently funded computer animated films,
received mixed reviews, and earned over $110 million worldwide.
Along with her husband, she served as a producer on the 2010 independent film Jeffie Was Here, directed by Todd Edwards.
Both her husband and her daughter Eva were diagnosed with Leukemia within the same year, however Eva was cured after two years of treatment.

Filmography

References

External links

Living people
American film producers
American film actresses
Disney people
Anderson University (Indiana) alumni
American women film producers
Year of birth missing (living people)